Chlorion is a genus of Hymenoptera of the Sphecidae family of wasps.

Species
Listed alphabetically.
Chlorion aerarium Patton, 1879 – Steel-blue Cricket Hunter Wasp, Aphid Wasp
Chlorion boharti Menke, 1961
Chlorion consanguineum (Kohl, 1898)
Chlorion cyaneum Dahlbom, 1843
Chlorion funereum Gribodo, 1879
Chlorion gratiosum (F. Smith, 1856)
Chlorion hemiprasinum (Sichel, 1863)
Chlorion hemipyrrhum (Sichel, 1863)
Chlorion hirtum (Kohl, 1885)
Chlorion lobatum (Fabricius, 1775)
Chlorion magnificum F. Morawitz, 1887
Chlorion maxillosum (Poiret, 1787) – Cricket Hunter Wasp
Chlorion migiurtinicum (Giordani Soika, 1941)   
Chlorion mirandum (Kohl, 1890)  
Chlorion regale F. Smith, 1873  
Chlorion semenowi F. Morawitz, 1890    
Chlorion splendidum Fabricius, 1804 
Chlorion strandi Willink, 1951
Chlorion striatum Li and Yang, 1989  
Chlorion viridicoeruleum Lepeletier de Saint Fargeau and Audinet-Serville, 1828

References

Sphecidae